is a Japanese writer from Kyoto. Her work has won the 103rd Bungakukai Prize and the 149th Akutagawa Prize.

Early life and education 
Fujino was born in Kyoto in 1980 and lived there through her school years, eventually completing a master's degree at Kyoto's Doshisha University with a thesis on the photographer Ihei Kimura. Though she had originally planned to become a museum curator, after graduating Fujino worked a part-time job at a publishing company to support her writing.

Career 
In 2006 Fujino made her literary debut with the story Iyashii tori, which won the 103rd Bungakukai Prize and was later published in a book of the same title. Her short novel Tsume to me (Nails and Eyes), about a young girl observing the behavior of her father's lover, was published in 2013. Tsume to me won the 149th Akutagawa Prize. Since winning the Akutagawa Prize Fujino has primarily published short stories, many of which have been collected in the 2014 book Fainaru Gāru (Final Girl) and the 2017 book Doresu (Dress).

In 2017 the Japan Foundation sponsored Fujino's residency in the International Writing Program at the University of Iowa.

Recognition
 2006 103rd Bungakukai Prize
 2013 149th Akutagawa Prize (2013上)

Works

Books in Japanese
 Iyashii tori, Bungei Shunjū, 2008, 
 Patorone, Shueisha, 2012, 
 Ohanashishitekochan, Kodansha, 2013, 
 Tsume to me (Nails and Eyes), Shinchosha, 2013, 
 Fainaru gāru (Final Girl), Fusōsha, 2014, 
 Doresu (Dress), Kawade Shobō Shinsha, 2017,

Selected work in English
 "You Okay For Time?", trans. Ginny Tapley Takemori, Granta, 2017

References

Akutagawa Prize winners
21st-century Japanese novelists
21st-century Japanese women writers
1980 births
Living people
Writers from Kyoto
International Writing Program alumni